José Miguel Martínez Hernández is Cuban dissident. He was a representative of Movimiento 24 de Febrero and was involved in Varela project. He was a librarian at General Juan Bruno Zayas Library.

He was sentenced to 13 years in prison in 2003, as a result of Black Spring crackdown on dissidents.  His cellmates refer to him as the Green Spider.

References

Living people
Cuban librarians
Cuban dissidents
Cuban democracy activists
Year of birth missing (living people)